Eduard Valenko (born 21 February 1960) is a former Ukrainian football forward and football referee (2000–2008).

References

External links
 
 

1960 births
Living people
Sportspeople from Lviv
Ukrainian footballers
Soviet footballers
FC Karpaty Lviv players
FC Podillya Khmelnytskyi players
FC Nyva Ternopil players
FC SKA-Karpaty Lviv players
FC Krystal Kherson players
FC Halychyna Drohobych players
FC Sokil Lviv players
FC Lviv (1992) players
CSF Bălți players
FC Mykolaiv players
Soviet Top League players
Ukrainian Premier League players
Ukrainian football referees
Ukrainian expatriate footballers
Expatriate footballers in Sweden
Ukrainian Cup top scorers
Association football forwards